This is a list of Panjabi films of the 2010s. For a complete alphabetical list, see :Category:Punjabi films.

2010

2011

2012

2013

2014

2015

2016

2017

2018

2019

2010s
Punjabi